Birkir Blær Óðinsson, (born 29 March 2000) is an Icelandic singer and winner of Swedish Idol 2021 which he won on 10 December, 2021, in Avicii Arena. He had only lived in Sweden since November 2020.

Discography

Singles

References

Living people
2000 births
Idol (Swedish TV series) participants
Idol (Swedish TV series) winners

Icelandic expatriates in Sweden
21st-century Icelandic singers
21st-century Swedish singers